Clematis pitcheri is a species of flowering plant in the buttercup family known by the common name bluebill. It is a herbaceous, perennial vine found in the south-central United States and northern Mexico. It grows in wooded, rocky outcrops, woodland margins, bluffs, and disturbed habitats. Leaves are variable, oppositely arranged along the stems, and can be simple or compound.

References

Flora of North America
Taxa named by John Torrey
Taxa named by Asa Gray
pitcheri